"If You Ever Come Back" is a song by Irish pop rock band the Script from their second studio album, Science & Faith. The song was released as the third single on 4 April 2011. It was written and produced by Danny O'Donoghue, Mark Sheehan, Steve Kipner, and Andrew Frampton.

Track listing

Personnel
Songwriting – Danny O'Donoghue, Mark Sheehan, Steve Kipner, Andrew Frampton
Production – Mark Sheehan, Danny O'Donoghue, Andrew Frampton, Steve Kipner
Drums, guitars, keyboards and vocals – The Script
Guitars, keyboards and programming – Andrew Frampton
Bass – Ben Sargeant

Charts

Certifications

References

2011 singles
The Script songs
Rock ballads
Songs written by Steve Kipner
2010 songs
Songs written by Danny O'Donoghue
Songs written by Mark Sheehan
Phonogenic Records singles
Epic Records singles
Songs written by Andrew Frampton (songwriter)